Samuele R. Bacchiocchi (29 January 1938 – 20 December 2008) was a Seventh-day Adventist author and theologian, best known for his work on the Sabbath in Christianity, particularly in the historical work From Sabbath to Sunday, based on his doctoral thesis from the Pontifical Gregorian University. Bacchiocchi defended the validity of the Feasts of the Lord, situated in Leviticus 23, he wrote two books on the subject. He was also known within the Seventh-day Adventist church for his opposition to rock and contemporary Christian music, jewelry, the celebration of Christmas and Easter, certain dress standards and alcohol.

Biography 
Bacchiocchi was born in Rome, Italy on 20 January 1938.

He later earned a Bachelor of Arts degree in theology from Newbold College in England, which was followed by a Master of Arts and Bachelor of Divinity at Andrews University in Michigan, United States; finishing in 1964. Bacchiocchi moved with his wife Anna to Kuyera, Shashamane district, Ethiopia, where he lectured in Bible and history.

In 1969 they returned to Rome where Bacchiocchi studied at the Pontifical Gregorian University. He was the first non-Catholic to be admitted since its establishment in the 16th century. He completed a Doctoratus in Church History in 1974 on the subject of the decline of Sabbath observance in the Early Christian church, based on his research in the Vatican libraries.

Bacchiocchi taught in the religion department of Andrews University from 1974 till his retirement in 2000. He taught theology and church history. He regularly presented seminars worldwide, and wrote many self-published books and articles on biblical topics. He was married to Anna Gandin Bacchiocchi. They had three children.

In May 2007, Bacchiocchi announced that he had developed liver and colon cancer. He ultimately succumbed to 4th stage liver cancer, shortly after midnight, Saturday 20 December 2008, the day before what would have been his 47th wedding anniversary. He was with his three children and his wife.

Impact 
In 1977 Bacchiocchi published From Sabbath to Sunday, documenting the historical transition from the Saturday Sabbath to Sunday in the early Christian church due to social, pagan and political factors, and also the decline of standards for the day. The book made an impact on the wider academic community outside Adventism, as well as within Adventism. Prior to his work, Seventh-day Adventists had focused on the role played by either the Pope, or by Roman Emperor Constantine I in the transition from Sabbath to Sunday, with Constantine's law declaring Sunday as a day of rest for those not involved in farming work. Subsequent to Bacchiocchi's work, Adventists have emphasized that the shift from Sabbath to Sunday was a more gradual process.

Bacchiocchi has also been influential in the Worldwide Church of God (and its offshoots), which supported Sabbath-keeping until 1995, and also other Sabbath keeping groups.

Beliefs 
Bacchiocchi supported the conservative lifestyle habits of Seventh-day Adventists, such as a vegetarian diet; abstinence from alcohol, coffee, and tea; and avoidance of rock music in church worship services.

In one newsletter he submitted an hypothesis, expanding upon the Adventist (and historical Protestant) teaching that the antichrist is the papacy, to also include Islam, which he reported "generated a lot of hate mail".

Controversy over academic awards 
There was some controversy in the 2000s over Bacchiocchi's claim to have received the awards summa cum laude (Latin for "with highest honors"), the Pope's gold medal, and an official Roman Catholic imprimatur (Latin for "let it be printed") for his doctorate at the Pontifical Gregorian University. An official letter claimed Bacchiocchi did not receive these awards. By 2007, both parties agreed he had received a summa cum laude and the Pope's gold medal, for the Licentia [a phase of the doctoral program]; and only a magna cum laude for the Doctoratus itself. Bacchiocchi defended his actions by claiming the difference between the Licentia and the Doctoratus is small and would not be understood by most English speakers.

Allegations of Jesuit Influence
Bacchiocchi was the target of speculation that he was a covert Jesuit infiltrating the Adventist Church on behalf of the Vatican.

On Bacchiocchi's website BiblicalPerspectives.com, he responds to Five Major Allegations:
 Being a Jesuit Spy
 Rejecting the Adventist interpretation of the Number 666 as Pope's title Vicarius Filii Dei
 Believing that EG White had human limitations and there were inaccuracies in the Great Controversy
 Questioning the legitimacy of the dates (538 to 1798) in the 1260 year prophecy
 Promoting the ceremonial observance of Old Testament Festivals

In an interview by Adventist Historian, James Arrabito, an allegation was made by Alberto Rivera (who claimed to himself have been a Jesuit which has been disputed by Catholic sources) that Bacchiocchi's book From Sabbath to Sunday was given as a ploy to win over Adventists.

In 2009 a book was released by AB Publishing written by Adventist evangelist Danny Vierra titled The Final Inquisition, Vierra questions what the impact of five years of doctoral studies at a Papal University founded by Ignatius of Loyola had on his theology.

Publications 
Bacchiocchi owned a small non-academic publishing house called Biblical Perspectives, through which he self-published 16 books of his own, and also a book by Graeme Bradford. He was the primary author of the Endtime Issues email newsletter.

Sabbath:
 From Sabbath to Sunday: A Historical Investigation of the Rise of Sunday Observance in Early Christianity (4 of 11 chapters online)
 Divine Rest for Human Restlessness: A Theological Study of the Good News of the Sabbath for Today (4 of 8 chapters online)
 The Sabbath in the New Testament: Answers to Questions (4 of 13 chapters online)
 The Sabbath Under Crossfire: A Biblical analysis of Recent Sabbath/Sunday Developments (4 chapters, plus chapter 7; of 7)

Other:
 Immortality or Resurrection? A Biblical Study on Human Nature and Destiny
 The Advent Hope for Human Hopelessness. A Theological Study of the Meaning of the Second Advent for Today
 Wine in the Bible: A Biblical Study on the Use of Alcoholic Beverages
 The Christian & Rock Music: A Study on Biblical Principles of Music
 Women in the Church: A Biblical Study on the Role of Women in the Church
 Christian Dress and Adornment
 The Passion of Christ: In Scripture and History
 The Marriage Covenant: A Biblical Study on Marriage, Divorce, and Remarriage
 Hal Lindsey’s Prophetic Jigsaw Puzzle: Five Predictions that Failed!
 God’s Festivals in Scripture and History. Volume I: The Spring Festivals
 God’s Festivals in Scripture and History. Volume 2: The Fall Festivals
 The Time of the Crucifixion and the Resurrection
 Popular Beliefs, Are They Biblical? 

Other authors:
 Biblical Perspectives also published More Than A Prophet by Graeme Bradford, which is fully and freely available online at SDAnet

See also 

 Seventh-day Adventist Church
 Ellen G. White
 Adventism
 Adventist Health Studies
 Seventh-day Adventist eschatology
 Seventh-day Adventist theology
 Seventh-day Adventist worship
 Sabbath in seventh-day churches
 Sabbath in Christianity
 History of the Seventh-day Adventist Church
 28 Fundamental Beliefs
 Questions on Doctrine
 Biblical Research Institute
 Teachings of Ellen G. White
 Inspiration of Ellen G. White
 Prophecy in the Seventh-day Adventist Church
 Investigative judgment
 The Pillars of Adventism
 Second Coming
 Conditional Immortality
 Historicism
 Three Angels' Messages
 Sabbath in seventh-day churches
 Inspiration of Ellen White
 Ellen G. White

References

External links 
 Bacchiocchi's Endtime Issues Newsletter Collection at archive.org
 Articles by Bacchiocchi cataloged in the Seventh-day Adventist Periodical Index (SDAPI)
 Obituary noting Bacchiocchi's role with the Worldwide Church of God

Seventh-day Adventist religious workers
Writers from Rome
Seventh-day Adventist theologians
20th-century Protestant theologians
Italian Seventh-day Adventists
Christian fundamentalists
Critics of the Catholic Church
1938 births
2008 deaths
Deaths from liver cancer
Deaths from cancer in Michigan
Andrews University alumni
Pontifical Gregorian University alumni